The 2003 British Formula Ford Championship is the 28th edition of the British Formula Ford Championship. It commenced on 21 April at Mondello Park and end on 21 September at Oulton Park after 10 rounds and 21 races, all in support of the British Touring Car Championship and Champ Car when they visited Brands Hatch in May. This was the last year until 2013 that the series supported the British Touring Car Championship as they switched to supporting the British GT and British Formula Three Championship from 2004 to 2012.

Drivers and teams

Race calendar and results

Drivers' Championship

Scholarship Class

References

External links
 The home of the British Formula Ford Championship 

British Formula Ford Championship seasons
Formula Ford